The 1992 Sonoma State Cossacks football team represented Sonoma State University as a member of the Northern California Athletic Conference (NCAC) during the 1992 NCAA Division II football season. Led by Tim Walsh in his fourth and final season as head coach, Sonoma State compiled an overall record of 7–3 with a mark of 3–2 in conference play, tying for second place in the NCAC. The team outscored its opponents 296 to 266 for the season. The Cossacks played home games at Cossacks Stadium in Rohnert Park, California.

Walsh finished his tenure at Sonoma State with an overall record of 27–14, for a .659 winning percentage. He was the most successful coach in the history of the Sonoma State Cossacks football program, with more wins and a higher winning percentage than any other coach.

Schedule

Notes

References

Sonoma State
Sonoma State Cossacks football seasons
Sonoma State Cossacks football